Polina Karika (born 25 June 2005) is a Ukrainian female rhythmic gymnast. She is the 2020 Junior European champion with Ball.

Career

Junior
She won bronze medal in Team competition at the 2020 Deriugina Cup. She competed at the 2020 Junior European Championships and won gold medal in Team competition. She also qualified to Ball final and won another gold medal.

References

External links 
 
 

2005 births
Living people
Ukrainian rhythmic gymnasts
Sportspeople from Zaporizhzhia
21st-century Ukrainian women
Competitors at the 2022 World Games